The Palos Verdes Library District (PVLD) is an independent special-purpose library district serving the roughly 69,843 residents of the Palos Verdes and Peninsula in Southern California. PVLD is governed by a publicly elected Board of Trustees that consists of five members who voluntarily serve without monetary compensation. PVLD's three libraries - Peninsula Center Library, Malaga Cove Library, and Miraleste Library - serve the cities of Palos Verdes Estates, Rancho Palos Verdes, Rolling Hills Estates, and Rolling Hills, California.

Services offered
PVLD's website offers access to a wealth of information including historic photos of the Palos Verdes Peninsula, information about early Japanese farmers on the Peninsula, databases and full-text magazine and newspaper articles, downloadable audio and e-books, and information about upcoming events and programs.

It offers interlibrary loan, and a passport acceptance agency. The Peninsula Center Library has notary public staff.

PVLD partners with the Palos Verdes Peninsula Unified School District to improve the quality of education for Palos Verdes students, as well as the Palos Verdes Peninsula Chamber of Commerce to support local businesses, and other local organizations to enhance the quality of life on the Palos Verdes Peninsula.

Board of Trustees
President:       Rosa Kwon Easton

Vice President:  Bob Park

Secretary:       Zoe Unno Ph.D.

Trustee:         Jonathan Beutler 

Trustee:         Kingston Wong

Volunteers
The Peninsula Friends of the Library is an all-volunteer membership organization founded in 1961, in order to enhance the services and programs of the Peninsula libraries.  Its membership fees, along with funds raised through book sales and the Library Shop at Peninsula Center Library, and other events are used to provide ongoing support for many services and programs including:

 Special purchases of items for the library collections, furnishings, and equipment.
 Sunday Hours at the Peninsula Center Library
 Summer Reading Program

References

External links

 Palos Verdes Library District

Libraries in Los Angeles County, California
Library districts